Montopoli in Val d'Arno is a comune (municipality) in the Province of Pisa in the Italian region Tuscany, located about  southwest of Florence and about  east of Pisa.

Montopoli in Val d'Arno borders the following municipalities: Castelfranco di Sotto, Palaia, Pontedera, San Miniato, Santa Maria a Monte.

It is home to a tower and an arch named after Castruccio Castracani, once belonging to a castle. Outside of town is the Franciscan Sanctuary of the Madonna di San Romano and the parish church of Santa Maria Novella.

References

Twin towns
 Torella dei Lombardi, Italy
 Maussane-les-Alpilles, France

External links

 Official website

Cities and towns in Tuscany